Haris Belkebla (born 28 January 1994) is an Algerian professional footballer who plays as a midfielder for Ligue 1 club Brest and Algeria national football team.

Club career
Born in La Courneuve, Belkebla began his career in the youth ranks of Boulogne before joining Valenciennes in 2012. In 2014, he joined Tours, signing an amateur contract with the club. He made his Ligue 2 debut at 8 August 2014 against Troyes AC in a 1–0 away loss.

In summer 2018, he moved to Stade Brestois 29.

International career
In October 2012, Belkebla was called up to the Algeria under-20 national team for the first time in preparation for the 2013 African U-20 Championship.

He was called up to the Algeria national football team playing the 2019 Africa Cup of Nations, but was shortly kicked off the team by the manager Djamel Belmadi for showing his buttocks on a live stream of his teammate Alexandre Oukidja playing Fortnite. He debuted for Algeria in a 5–0 win over Zambia on 14 November 2019.

Personal life
Belkebla is the nephew of former professional footballer Youssef Belkebla, who played for Red Star and Saint-Étienne.

Career statistics

Club

References

1994 births
Living people
Kabyle people
Footballers from Seine-Saint-Denis
French sportspeople of Algerian descent
Algerian footballers
French footballers
Association football midfielders
Algeria international footballers
Algeria youth international footballers
Footballers at the 2016 Summer Olympics
Olympic footballers of Algeria
Tours FC players
Stade Brestois 29 players
Ligue 1 players
Ligue 2 players
Championnat National 2 players
Championnat National 3 players
2021 Africa Cup of Nations players